Bridge on the River Wye is an album by members of the British comedy group The Goon Show and other humorists. It was produced by George Martin for EMI's Parlophone Records. It is a parody of the 1957 film The Bridge on the River Kwai. For legal reasons, the 'K' at the start of Kwai was edited out.

The record stars Spike Milligan, Peter Sellers, Jonathan Miller and Peter Cook, and also features Peter Rawley and Patricia Ridgway, with incidental music composed and directed by Angela Morley.

The script was written by Spike Milligan, based on an earlier script by Milligan and Larry Stephens for The Goon Show, "African Incident" (Series 8, Episode 14), first broadcast on BBC radio on 30 December 1957.

The record jacket advises, "For best results, play this record in a circular fashion".
Artwork was designed by Dennis Gosling (1934–2014).

References

1962 albums
Comedy albums by British artists
Albums produced by George Martin
Parlophone albums
1960s comedy albums